Nigel Boulton is a Welsh former footballer who currently coaches in the United States.

Playing career
Boulton played semi-professionally for Sully A.F.C., a three-time Wales Premier League champion and three time Senior Cup Winner. In 1988, he joined the coaching ranks with Sully and took the club to second in its division. He also led the South Wales representative (All-Star) team to back-to-back J.J. Baily Trophy wins against English league opposition in both 1988 and 1989. He was appointed a District Coach for the F.A. of Wales the same year.

Coaching
In 1990, Soccer USA hired Boulton and he moved to the United States. Boulton was the executive director and director of coaching for the Arkansas State Soccer Association. Bill Clinton appointed him to the Governor's Council on Physical Fitness & Sports in 1994 until he left for Boston. During his time in Arkansas he part-owned and managed the USISL franchise the Arkansas A's from 1992–94. In 1997, Boulton left Arkansas to become the head coach of the Boston-based Worcester Wildfire of the USISL A-League, the forerunner of today's USL First Division. That year the Wildfire was the farm team for Major League Soccer's New England Revolution. The next year, Boulton moved back to the south where he became the Mississippi Youth Soccer Association's statewide Director of Coaching. As a DOC in both Arkansas and in Mississippi, the United States Soccer Federation named Boulton a national scout for the Project 2010 program and as a national course instructor for the training of coaches. He was also a member of the Olympic Development Program regional and state staff for many years.

College Years.

In March 2003, William Carey University hired Boulton as its men's soccer coach. He was named G.C.A.C. Coach of the Year the first year. His team won the G.C.A.C. Championship in 2007. The following year, 2008, he recorded his 50th collegiate career win as his team won the G.C.A.C regular-season title and he was again named G.C.A.C. Coach of the Year. In 2009, he was named GCAC Coach of the Year for a third time as his team again took the regular-season title finishing ranked #9 in the NAIA National Poll and also qualifying for the national championship tournament. In 2010 Carey again qualified for the national championship tournament. In 2011 Boulton's team reached the semi-final stage of the NAIA national championship tournament and were placed at #4 in the post-season national rankings. Boulton was also named a National Soccer Coaches Association of America National Coach of the Year finalist, regional winner and NAIA Regional Coach of the Year. In 2012 Boulton recorded his 100th collegiate career win. He went on to rack up a career total of 134 wins.

Founder of Southern States Soccer

In 2015 Boulton founded Southern States Soccer leaving William Carey University after 12 years. The organization based in Hattiesburg, Mississippi has grown from three to currently twelve teams playing in 'The Academy' and the Player Performance Centers (PDC). Boulton later sold his ownership to a group of committed investors and now works as the Director of Soccer Operations as well as coaching in the academy. Boulton's former college assistant and NAIA All-American player Carl Reynolds is the Director of Player Development.

External links
William Carey University profile

1953 births
Footballers from Cardiff
Living people
Welsh footballers
American soccer coaches
USISL coaches
Association football defenders
Association football midfielders